Justice Coalition (Shudarga yos evsel) was a parliamentary coalition in the Mongolian Parliament, the State Great Khural, after the 2012 parliamentary elections that they fought together under the Coalition platform. The coalition sat with 11 members in the Parliament.

After negotiations with the ruling Democratic Party, the Justice Coalition entered, as a minority partner, into a coalition government formed by the ruling Democratic Party.

The Justice Coalition was made up of mainly two political formations:
Mongolian National Democratic Party (also known as MNDP / ) established in 2005
Mongolian People's Revolutionary Party, (also known as MPRP / ) established in 2010

See also
Politics of Mongolia
List of political parties in Mongolia

References

Political party alliances in Mongolia